Thief's Player Pack is an accessory for the 2nd edition of the Advanced Dungeons & Dragons fantasy role-playing game.

Contents
The Thief's Player Pack is an AD&D game accessory which comes in a case with everything a newcomer needs to get his thief PC ready for a campaign: a pad of character sheets, a stand-up reference screen, a brief but informative player's guide, seven polyhedral dice, three pewter miniatures, and a shiny red pencil. The case is designed so that a copy of the Player's Handbook can fit snugly inside the lid.

Publication history
Thief's Player Pack was designed by William W. Connors, and published by TSR, Inc.

Reception
Rick Swan reviewed Thief's Player Pack for Dragon magazine #214 (February 1995). He commented that: "One of the joys of any hobby is collecting all the junk that goes with it. These AD&D game accessories [...] are a pack rat's dream come true." Swan concludes by saying: "Though recommended for ages 10 to adult, the Player Packs tilt toward the younger end of that scale—I can't imagine a 40-year-old hauling around a plastic briefcase. But if you're trying to lure a reluctant youngster into your campaign, you couldn't ask for better bait."

References

Dungeons & Dragons sourcebooks
Role-playing game supplements introduced in 1994